In the Name of the Father is a 1969 Italian western comedy film directed by Ruggero Deodato and starring the popular Italian comedian Paolo Villaggio, Oreste Lionello, Lino Toffolo and Enrico Montesano.

Cast

References

Bibliography

External links
 

Films directed by Ruggero Deodato
Films scored by Luis Bacalov
Films with screenplays by Maurizio Costanzo